Calophyllum soulattri is a species of flowering plant in the Calophyllaceae family. It is found in the Northern Territory of Australia, Brunei, Cambodia, India, Indonesia, Malaysia, the Philippines, Singapore, Sri Lanka, Thailand, and Vietnam. It is considered one of the best bintangor timber species.

See also
Domesticated plants and animals of Austronesia

References

soulattri
Flora of tropical Asia
Malpighiales of Australia
Least concern flora of Australia
Flora of the Northern Territory
Taxonomy articles created by Polbot
Taxa named by Nicolaas Laurens Burman